The first season of The Real Housewives of New York City, an American reality television series, is broadcast on Bravo. It aired March 4, 2008 until May 27, 2008, and is primarily filmed in New York City, New York. Its executive producers are Andrew Hoegl, Barrie Bernstein, Lisa Shannon, Pam Healy and Andy Cohen.

The Real Housewives of New York City focuses on the lives of Bethenny Frankel, LuAnn de Lesseps, Alex McCord, Ramona Singer and Jill Zarin. It consisted of 9 episodes.

Production and crew
The Real Housewives of New York City’s production of the series began in November 2007. 
In January, 2008 it was revealed that Manhattan Moms has been re-titled to The Real Housewives of New York City as well as its premiere date.<ref>{{cite web|title=MTV Adds 'Gauntlet Iii,' Bravo Slates 'Top Chef 4|url=http://www.thefutoncritic.com/news/2008/01/04/mtv-adds-gauntlet-iii-bravo-slates-top-chef-4-26362/7533/|website=The Futon Critic|accessdate=August 30, 2016}}</ref> The following week the full cast of the first season had been announced with Frances Berwick, the Executive Vice President to Bravo saying, "This series will explore the personal and professional lives of five ambitious women who in the upper crust of New York." The series premiered with 0.82 total million viewers, which at the time was deemed impressive. During the course of its first season The Real Housewives of New York City averaged 1.13 total million viewers 

The season premiere "Meet the Wives" was aired on March 4, 2008, while the seventh episode "Second Chances" served as the season finale, and was aired on April 15, 2008.
It was followed by a reunion episode that aired on April 22, 2008  and a "Lost Footage"  episode on May 27, 2008, which marked the conclusion of the season.
Andrew Hoegl, Barrie Bernstein, Lisa Shannon, Pam Healy and Andy Cohen are recognized as the series' executive producers; it is produced by Ricochet and is distributed by Shed Media.

Cast and synopsis
Five housewives were featured during the first season of The Real Housewives of New York City, which were describe as "elite and powerful set of New York socialites as they juggle their careers and home lives with busy calendars packed with charity fund-raising galas, the social whirl of the Hamptons, and interviews for elite private schools," as well as "driven and ambitious women show everyone what it takes to make it in the upper echelon of society, where money and status are an essential way of life."

Ramona Singer gets ready for a trip to the Hamptons, causing her daughter Avery to question her fashion choices. After a fashion show Singer catches her husband Mario flirting with a woman, also noticing he isn't wearing his wedding ring. Singer encourages her daughter's endeavors in to acting by taking her to an agency  and later takes her to an audition where Singer takes control.
LuAnn de Lesseps move her and her family in to their Hamptons home for the summer and de Lesseps bonds with Zarin over their teenage daughters. De Lesseps teaches Bethenny Frankel about class and etiquette.
Frankel continues to work on her career and aspires to become the next Martha Stewart. Frankel wants to settle down with her current boyfriend Jason and have a family however she's concerned that he isn't ready to as he already has three children.
Jill Zarin supports her daughter's decision to improve her health by going to a detox clinic at Martha's Vineyard. At the end of the summer, Zarin and Singer duke it out during a tennis match, however the sportsmanship is less than friendly. Tensions worsen between the two at a fashion show where Singer is seated front row and Zarin isn't.
Alex McCord and her husband go against the grain and head to  St. Barts for the summer, after deeming vacationing in the Hamptons as "too much work." McCord attends her son's school evaluation alone, due to her husband heading back to Australia after finding out his stepfather has died.

Episodes

DVD releases
The first season was released on DVD by Bravo Media on January 1, 2009. The box set is composed of three discs. The first season was also part of The Real Housewives of New York - Complete Series'' a 47 disc box set that included season 1 - 9 and that was released on November 17, 2017. The show has never been released on Blu-ray.

References

External links

 

2008 American television seasons
New York City (season 1)